Yang Guang (杨光), often referred to in western order as Guang Yang, is a Chinese mezzo-soprano. She won the BBC Cardiff Singer of the World competition in 1997, and the 2001 Operalia Competition. She attended the summer conservatory program of the Music Academy of the West in 2001. She studied at The Juilliard School with Cynthia Hoffmann.

References

Further reading
Murray, William (2010). Fortissimo: Backstage at the Opera with Sacred Monsters and Young Singers, pp. 144–147. Random House. 

Living people
Chinese mezzo-sopranos
Operalia, The World Opera Competition prize-winners
Year of birth missing (living people)
20th-century Chinese women opera singers
21st-century Chinese women opera singers
Juilliard School alumni
Music Academy of the West alumni